This is a list of films featuring Harry Carey.

1910
 Bill Sharkey's Last Game 
 Gentleman Joe

1912

 An Unseen Enemy as The Thief
 Two Daughters of Eve as In Audience
 Friends as Bob Kyne - the Prospector
 So Near, yet So Far as A Thief
 A Feud in the Kentucky Hills as Second Clan Member
 In the Aisles of the Wild as Bob Cole
 The One She Loved as The Neighbor's Friend
 The Painted Lady as At Ice Cream Festival (uncredited)
 The Musketeers of Pig Alley as Snapper's Sidekick
 Heredity as White Renegade Father
 Gold and Glitter as Lumberman (uncredited)
 The Informer as The Union Corporal
 Brutality as At Theatre
 My Hero as Indian
 The Burglar's Dilemma as Older Crook
 A Cry for Help as The Thief
 The God Within

1913

 Three Friends as In Saloon / In First Factory (uncredited)
 The Telephone Girl and the Lady as The Thief
 Pirate Gold
 An Adventure in the Autumn Woods as Third Thief
 A Misappropriated Turkey as The Bartender
 Brothers as The Mother's Favorite Son
 Oil and Water as Stage Manager / At Dinner
 A Chance Deception as Raffles
 Love in an Apartment Hotel as The Thief
 The Wrong Bottle as Undetermined Minor Role (uncredited)
 Broken Ways as The Sheriff
 A Girl's Stratagem as Girl's Sweetheart
 The Unwelcome Guest as The Sheriff
 Near to Earth
 The Sheriff's Baby as Second Bandit
 The Hero of Little Italy as Tony
 The Stolen Bride as The Husband
 A Frightful Blunder as The Superintendent
 The Left-Handed Man as The Left-Handed Thief
 If We Only Knew as The Sailor
 The Wanderer as A Soldier (uncredited)
 The Tenderfoot's Money as The Gambler
 The Stolen Loaf as The Butler
 Olaf—An Atom as Olaf
 A Dangerous Foe as The 'Bull'
 The Ranchero's Revenge as The Schemer
 Red Hicks Defies the World as In Crowd (uncredited)
 The Well as Giuseppe, the Farmhand

 The Switch Tower
 In Diplomatic Circles as The Butler
 A Gamble with Death as The Cowpuncher
 The Sorrowful Shore as The Widowed Father
 The Enemy's Baby as Miller
 The Mistake as Undetermined Role 
 A Gambler's Honor as The Gambler
 The Mirror as First Tramp
 The Vengeance of Galora as A Prospector
 When Love Forgives as Second Criminal
 Under the Shadow of the Law as The Convict
 I Was Meant for You as Luke
 Two Men of the Desert
 The Crook and the Girl as The Crook
 Black and White
 The Strong Man's Burden as Bob - the Younger Brother
 A Modest Hero
 The Stolen Treaty as The Detective
 The Law and His Son as Manning
 A Tender-Hearted Crook as The Thief
 The Van Nostrand Tiara as Society Detective
 Madonna of the Storm as Undetermined Role 
 The Stopped Clock as The Detective
 The Detective's Stratagem as Keene, the Detective
 All for Science as The Young Man
 The Battle at Elderbush Gulch 
 The Abandoned Well as The Adopted Son

1914
 A Nest Unfeathered as The Foreman
 Her Father's Silent Partner
 Judith of Bethulia as Assyrian Traitor
 Brute Force as In Womanless Tribe
 The Master Cracksman as Gentleman Joe, the Cracksman
 McVeagh of the South Seas as Cyril Bruce McVeagh

1915

 The Heart of a Bandit as Texas Pete - the Bandit
 His Desperate Deed as Burleigh
 The Battle of Frenchman's Run
 The Love Transcendent as The Prospector
 Perils of the Jungle
 The Sheriff's Dilemma as The Sheriff
 The Miser's Legacy as Jackson - The Crook
 The Gambler's I.O.U. as Dave Dawson
 A Double Winning as 2nd Sportsman
 A Day's Adventure as Hogan - Leader of the Crooks

 The Canceled Mortgage as 1st Road Agent
 Truth Stranger Than Fiction as Crook
 Her Dormant Love as Dandy Dick - The Fugitive
 The Way Out as The Bandit
 Her Convert as The Converted Cracksman
 Old Offenders as Norris
 As It Happened as The New Foreman
 Just Jim as Jim
 Judge Not; or The Woman of Mona Diggings as Miles Rand
 Graft as Tom Larnigan (Episodes 4-12)

1916

 Secret Love(Extant; Library of Congress) as Fergus Derrick
 A Knight of the Range as Cheyenne Harry
 The Night Riders
 The Passing of Hell's Crown as Blaze
 The Wedding Guest as The Squarest Sheriff Alive
 The Three Godfathers as Bob Sangster
 The Jackals of a Great City as Tom Wayne
 The Committee on Credentials as Ballaret Bill

 For the Love of a Girl as Black La Rue
 Love's Lariat as Sky High
 A Woman's Eyes as Tom Horn
 The Devil's Own as Shifty
 Behind the Lines as Dr. Ralph Hamlin
 The Conspiracy as Dick Olney
 Guilty as Ramon Valentine

1917

 Blood Money as Cheyenne Harry
 The Bad Man of Cheyenne as Cheyenne Harry
 The Outlaw and the Lady as Cheyenne Harry
 The Drifter as Cheyenne Harry
 Goin' Straight as Cheyenne Harry
 The Fighting Gringo as William 'Red' Saunders
 Hair-Trigger Burke as Hair Trigger Burke
 The Honor of an Outlaw as Cheyenne Harry
 A 44-Calibre Mystery as Sheriff Cheyenne Harry
 The Almost Good Man as Dick Glenning
 The Mysterious Outlaw as Buck Lessen

 The Golden Bullet as Jack
 The Wrong Man as Cheyenne Harry
 Six-Shooter Justice as Cheyenne Harry
 The Soul Herder as Cheyenne Harry
 Cheyenne's Pal as Cheyenne Harry
 Straight Shooting as Cheyenne Harry
 The Texas Sphinx as Jim Cranman
 The Secret Man as Cheyenne Harry
 A Marked Man as Cheyenne Harry
 Bucking Broadway as Cheyenne Harry

1918
 The Phantom Riders as Cheyenne Harry
 Wild Women as Cheyenne Harry
 Thieves' Gold as Cheyenne Harry
 The Scarlet Drop as 'Kaintuck' Harry Ridge
 Hell Bent as Cheyenne Harry
 A Woman's Fool as Lin McLean
 Three Mounted Men as Cheyenne Harry

1919
 Roped as Cheyenne Harry
 A Fight for Love as Cheyenne Harry
 Bare Fists as Cheyenne Harry
 Riders of Vengeance as Cheyenne Harry
 The Outcasts of Poker Flat as Square Shootin' Harry Lanyon / John Oakhurst
 Ace of the Saddle as Cheyenne Harry
 Rider of the Law as Jim Kyneton
 A Gun Fightin' Gentleman as Cheyenne Harry
 Marked Men as Cheyenne Harry

1920
 Overland Red as Overland Red
 Bullet Proof as Pierre Winton
 Human Stuff as James 'Jim' Pierce
 Blue Streak McCoy as Job McCoy
 Sundown Slim as Sundown Slim
 West Is West as Dick Rainboldt
 'If Only' Jim as Jim Golden

1921
 Hearts Up as David Brent
 The Freeze-Out as Ohio, the Stranger
 The Wallop as John Wesley Pringle
 Desperate Trails as Bart Carson
 The Fox as Ol' Santa Fe

1922
 Man to Man as Steve Packard
 The Kickback as White Horse Harry
 Good Men and True as J. Wesley Pringle

1923
 Canyon of the Fools as Bob
 Crashin' Thru as Blake
 Desert Driven as Bob
 The Miracle Baby as Neil Allison

1924
 The Night Hawk as 'The Hawk'
 The Lightning Rider as Phlip Morgan
 Tiger Thompson as Tiger Thompson
 Roaring Rails as Big Bill Benson
 The Flaming Forties as Bill Jones
 The Man from Texas

1925
 Soft Shoes as Pat Halahan
 Beyond the Border as Bob Smith
 Silent Sanderson as Joel Parsons / Silent Sanderson
 The Texas Trail as Pete Grainger
 The Bad Lands as Patrick Angus O'Toole
 The Prairie Pirate as Brian Delaney aka The Yellow Seal
 The Man from Red Gulch as Alexander 'Sandy' Morton

1926
 Driftin' Thru as Daniel Brown
 The Seventh Bandit as David Scanlon
 The Frontier Trail as Jim Cardigan
 Satan Town as Bill Scott

1927
 A Little Journey as Alexander Smith
 Johnny Get Your Hair Cut
 Slide, Kelly, Slide as Tom Munson

1928
 The Trail of '98 as Jack Locasto
 Burning Bridges as Jim Whitely / Bob Whitely
 The Border Patrol as Bill Storm

1931
 Trader Horn as Aloysius 'Trader' Horn
 The Vanishing Legion as 'Happy' Cardigan
 Bad Company as McBaine
 Cavalier of the West as Capt. John Allister

1932
 Without Honor as Pete Marlan
 Law and Order as Ed Brandt
 Border Devils as Jim Gray
 The Last of the Mohicans as Hawkeye
 The Night Rider as John Brown posing as Jim Blake
 The Devil Horse as Bob Norton / Roberts

1933
 The Thundering Herd as Clark Sprague
 Sunset Pass as John Hesbitt
 Man of the Forest as Jim Gayner

1935
 Wagon Trail as Sheriff Clay Hartley
 Rustler's Paradise as Cheyenne Kincaid
 Powdersmoke Range as Tucson Smith
 Barbary Coast as Jed Slocum
 Wild Mustang as Joe 'Wild Mustang' Norton
 The Last of the Clintons as Trigger Carson

1936
 The Prisoner of Shark Island as Commandant of Fort Jefferson
 Ghost Town as Cheyenne Harry Morgan
 Sutter's Gold as Kit Carson
 Little Miss Nobody as John Russell
 The Last Outlaw as Dean Payton
 Aces Wild as Cheyenne Harry Morgan
 Valiant Is the Word for Carrie as Phil Yonne
 The Accusing Finger as Sen. Nash

1937
 Racing Lady as Tom Martin
 Kid Galahad as Silver Jackson
 Lest We Forget as Himself
 Border Cafe as Tex Stevens
 Born Reckless as Dad Martin
 Souls at Sea as Captain of 'William Brown'
 Annapolis Salute as Chief Martin
 Danger Patrol as Sam Street

1938
 The Port of Missing Girls as Captain Josiah Storm
 You and Me as Jerome Morris
 Sky Giant as Col. Cornelius Stockton
 Gateway as Commissioner Nelson
 King of Alcatraz as Captain Glennan
 The Law West of Tombstone as Bill Barker

1939
 Burn 'Em Up O'Connor as P. G. 'Pinky' Delano
 Code of the Streets as Detective Lieutenant John Lewis
 Street of Missing Men as Charles Putnam
 Inside Information as Captain Bill Dugan
 Mr. Smith Goes to Washington as President of the Senate
 My Son Is Guilty as Police Officer Tim Kerry

1940s

 Outside the Three-Mile Limit (1940) as Captain Bailey
 Beyond Tomorrow (1940) as George Melton
 They Knew What They Wanted (1940) as The doctor
 The Shepherd of the Hills (1941) as Daniel Howitt
 Parachute Battalion (1941) as Bill Richards
 Sundown (1941) as Dewey
 Among the Living (1941) as Dr. Ben Saunders
 The Spoilers (1942) as Al Dextry
 Air Force (1943) as Crew Chief Sgt. White

 Happy Land (1943) as Gramp
 The Great Moment (1944) as Professor John C. Warren
 China's Little Devils (1945) as Doc Temple
 Duel in the Sun (1946) as Lem Smoot
 Angel and the Badman (1947) as McClintock
 The Sea of Grass (1947) as Doc J. Reid
 Red River (1948) as Mr. Melville
 So Dear to My Heart (1948) as head judge at County Fair (final film role)

References
 

Carey, Harry
Carey, Harry